The Chinese salamander (Hynobius chinensis) is a species of salamander in the family Hynobiidae endemic to China. Its natural habitats are subtropical or tropical moist lowland forests, rivers, freshwater marshes, freshwater springs, and arable land. It is threatened by habitat loss.

The Chinese salamander is a terrestrial animal and only lives in water during its breeding period.

References

Hynobius
Amphibians described in 1889
Taxa named by Albert Günther
Endemic fauna of China
Taxonomy articles created by Polbot